Efferent may refer to:

Anatomical structures
Meaning 'conveying away from a center':
Efferent arterioles, conveying blood away from the Bowman's capsule in the kidney
Efferent nerve fiber, carries nerve impulses away from the central nervous system toward the peripheral effector organs
Efferent lymph vessel, lymph vessels that carry lymph from a lymph node
Efferent ducts, connect the rete testis with the initial section of the epididymis

Other uses
Efferent coupling, a metric in software development

See also
Afferent (disambiguation)